Hughes Network Systems, LLC is a wholly owned subsidiary of EchoStar. It is headquartered in Germantown, Maryland and provides satellite internet service. HughesNet has over 1.3 million subscribers in the Americas.

History
Hughes Communications was founded in 1971 under the name Digital Communication Corporation (DCC) by a group of seven engineers and a lawyer led by John Puente and Dr. Burton Edelson, who all previously worked together at Comsat Laboratories. With $40,000 in startup capital, the company operated from a garage in Rockville, Maryland, designing circuit boards for telecom related products.
 
By 1977, Digital Communications Corp. had 250 employees and $10.6 million in revenue. In 1978, Digital Communications Corp. was acquired by Microwave Associates for an undisclosed sum, becoming MA/COM-DCC and began developing satellite related products. The company invented the very small aperture terminal (VSAT) in 1985. That year, the company sold its first VSAT network to Wal-Mart, which used the “technology to connect retail stores in rural areas.” According to SatMagazine, “the global VSAT market is estimated to reach $10 billion by 2021.” In 1987, MA/COM-DCC was acquired by Hughes Aircraft Corporation for $105 million and renamed Hughes Communications.

In 2004, News Corp acquired a controlling interest in Hughes through a $6.5 billion purchase intended primarily for its DirecTV unit. DirecTV also began selling off its ownership interests, culminating in a $100 million sale to a private equity firm. As a result, Hughes became a wholly owned subsidiary of SkyTerra Communications Inc., which was controlled by the investment firm. Hughes Communications was spun-off as an independent public company in 2007 and was acquired by EchoStar for about $2 billion in 2011.

Technology and services
HughesNet is Hughes Network Systems' satellite-based broadband internet service. As of 2017, Hughes controls 60 percent of the market for residential satellite-based internet connections, which are mostly used by rural customers out-of-reach of wired infrastructure. Hughes also markets its services to government, business, and military.

Satellite systems
In 2012, Hughes launched the Jupiter (stylized as JUPITER) System, Hughes' VSAT ground system that provides high-performance terminals, increased gateway architecture, and advanced air interface for both high-throughput and conventional satellites. The Jupiter System supports applications such as broadband Internet and Intranet access, community Wi-Fi hotspots, cellular backhaul, digital signage and mobility, including airborne services.

Through its Jupiter Aero System, an integrated system of airborne and ground equipment and software, Hughes provides broadband access to aircraft. As of 2018, about 1,000 aircraft carry Hughes technology on board.

In March 2018, Hughes announced improvements to the Jupiter system, doubling the throughput of HT2xxx terminals to more than 200 Mbit/s and increasing capacity.

Hughes HX and HT satellite broadband platforms are used for broadband IP services, high speed internet, VoIP, and video by telecom providers around the world and the military.

Hughes has deployed more nearly 6 million VSAT terminals of all types in more than 100 countries, representing approximately 50 percent market share.

Satellite services
Hughes satellite backhaul of cellular service extends 4G/LTE service to remote and rural areas around the world, specifically where conventional backhaul is difficult or costly due to geography and terrain.

Hughes cellular backhaul applications include a 4G/LTE optimization capability that yields up to 60 percent bandwidth savings.

HughesNet
In 1996, Hughes introduced a satellite Internet service for consumers and small businesses. The service was originally known as DirecPC and was renamed Direcway in May 2002. In 2012, with Hughes' first offering of broadband satellite Internet, it was renamed HughesNet. In March 2017, Hughes became the first satellite-based internet provider to meet the Federal Communications Commission's definition of "broadband" with HughesNet Gen5 after launching the EchoStar XVII and XIX high-throughput satellites. As of October 2018, Hughes is the largest satellite internet provider in the U.S., with 1.3 million subscribers. The FCC Measuring Broadband America report ranked HughesNet number one among all internet service providers for meeting or exceeding advertised download speeds for four years in a row from 2014 through 2017. For three out of four years (2014, 2015 and 2017), HughesNet ranked number one for meeting or exceeding both download and upload advertised speeds.

The long distance to the geosynchronous orbit used by Hughesnet increases latency to over 600 ms, over 10 times more than terrestrial or low Earth orbit systems like Starlink, rendering it much less competitive for applications like videoconferencing and video gaming.

In 2016, Hughes expanded HughesNet into Brazil, marking its first international expansion of the service. It expanded into Colombia in September 2017, into Peru in October 2018, and into Ecuador in December 2018.

Managed network services
Hughes offers managed network services for distributed enterprise businesses and government organizations. Its HughesON managed services include SD-WAN, Wi-Fi and location analytics and cloud-based digital signage and employee training.

See also
Hughes Europe

Explanatory notes

References

External links
 Official Website

2011 mergers and acquisitions
American companies established in 1971
American corporate subsidiaries
Communications satellite operators
Companies based in Germantown, Maryland
EchoStar
Satellite Internet access
Telecommunications companies established in 1971
Telecommunications companies of the United States
Former General Motors subsidiaries